Adrian Lulgjuraj  (born 19 August 1980) is a Montenegrin-born Albanian singer . Together with Bledar Sejko, he represented Albania in the Eurovision Song Contest 2013 in Malmö with the song "Identitet". The song failed to qualify for the final.

Biography
Lulgjuraj was born in the coastal city of Ulcinj (Albanian: Ulqin) to an Albanian family, the southernmost city of Montenegro. Although raised in an Albanian-majority city, Lulgjuraj was always involved in projects and festivals all over Montenegro. He is known for his charity work and the original genre in music. Lulgjuraj entered the Albanian music industry in early 2010, participating in various TV shows and music festivals such as Top Fest. He entered the competition twice, both times entering the finals, and receiving numerous awards. Lulgjuraj was also a helping-coach in The Voice of Albania, the Albanian version of The Voice of Holland.

Private life
Adrian is married to Ana Pejović Lulgjuraj, former Miss Montenegro in 2000. They have 2 children.

Discography
 2012: "Identitet" (Identity) (feat. Bledar Sejko)
 2012: "Evoloj" (Evolve)
 2011: "Të mori një det" (You went away)

Awards

Festivali i Këngës

|-
||2012
||"Identitet (feat .Bledar Sejko )"
|First Prize
|
|}

Top Fest

|-
||2012
||"Evuloj"
|Best Male
|
|}

Notes

References

Living people
Albanian rock singers
People from Ulcinj
1980 births
Albanians in Montenegro
Albanian Roman Catholics
21st-century Albanian male  singers
Festivali i Këngës winners
Eurovision Song Contest entrants of 2013
Eurovision Song Contest entrants for Albania